Amar Godomat (or Amar Gôdômat) is the name given in oral tradition to an 11th-century Serer archer.

Mauritanian oral tradition claims Abu Bakr was killed in a clash with the "Gangara" (Soninke Wangara} of the Tagant Region of southern Mauritania), relating that he was struck down by an arrow from an old, blind Gangara chieftain in the pass of Khma (between the Tagant and Assab mountains, en route to Ghana). According to Wolof oral tradition, a Serer bowman named Amar Godomat killed him with his bow near lake Rzik (just north of the Senegal) (Godomat's name apparently originates with this death). The battle is reported to have taken place near Khoo mak in Serer country, commonly known as Lake Cayor.

One source discussing this oral tradition says that "almoravid Abu Bakar Ben Umar wad killed by the arrow of serer warrior Amar Godomat, in the month of shaa'ban 480 (november 1087). this regicide potentially signals his exodus after taking the name "Amar god o maat", "Amar (which) killed (the) king"."

Another source for Abu Bakr's death says "In the region of Tagant on his way to Djabal al-Dbahab, the Mountain of Gold, he was wounded, according to the chronicles, by a poisoned arrow, shot by an old black bowman who could not see unless his eye- lids were raised up to uncover his eyeballs. The black bowman asked his daughter to hold open his eyes so that he could aim his arrow. It struck the Amir in the knee. Abu Bakr turned his horse around and rode off..." dying when he arrived in Tagant.

See also 

Serer people
Serer Religion
Serer history (medieval era to present)

Notes 

Archers
Military history of Africa
Serer royalty
Maad
Serer patriarchs